Iván Velasco Murillo (born 7 February 1980 in Mondragón, Basque Country) is a Spanish former road bicycle racer, who competed professionally between 2006 and 2014 for the ,  and  teams.

Major results

2012
 9th Overall Vuelta a Castilla y León
 10th Overall Vuelta a La Rioja

References

External links

Ivan Velasco's profile on Cycling Base
Profile at Euskaltel-Euskadi official website 

Cyclists from the Basque Country (autonomous community)
Spanish male cyclists
1980 births
Living people
People from Mondragón
Sportspeople from Gipuzkoa